The Mormons is a four-hour PBS documentary about the Church of Jesus Christ of Latter-day Saints (LDS Church).  The production originally aired in two-hour segments on April 30 and May 1, 2007.  It was produced by Helen Whitney, and was the first joint production of Frontline and American Experience.

Content
The first segment is about the history of The Church of Jesus Christ of Latter-day Saints. It deals with the story of Joseph Smith. The First Vision is told and after that the visit of the Angel Moroni who gave him the golden plates, from which the Book of Mormon is said to be translated. Then the topic of anti-Mormonism is  brought up, followed by an episode about Mormonism and polygamy and the Mountain Meadows massacre.

The second segment is about the contemporary LDS Church. It shows the Mormon missionaries. Followed by the September Six and a discussion of homosexuality and The Church of Jesus Christ of Latter-day Saints. At the end, the topics of Mormonism and women and the change of oneself through a mission are discussed.

Reviews
The New York Times said about the documentary: "Yet the portrait of the modern-day church, which the program says has 12 million members worldwide, is compelling nonetheless." On the other hand, The Boston Globe criticised the documentary: "The Mormons brims with informed talking heads – church historians, journalists, church elders, and a constellation of happy Mormons. It would have helped to identify Mormon from non-Mormon but never mind. Mitt Romney appears briefly in a film clip but is never heard from; according to PBS, he declined to participate." Reuters however said: "If there is a weak point to this hugely informative and watchable series, it may be the amount of time allocated in the second night to the practice of Mormon missions and the church's heavy-handed approach to critics. Regardless, this is a brilliant work on a engaging topic." The Nation was also disappointed by this documentary.

See also

 Latter Day Saints in popular culture
 Mormons
 Public relations of The Church of Jesus Christ of Latter-day Saints

References

Further reading

External links
 Official website of The Mormons documentary
 Part 1 on PBS    
 Part 2 on PBS

2007 in American television
2007 in Christianity
American Experience
History of the Latter Day Saint movement
Latter Day Saints in popular culture
Television series by WGBH
21st-century Mormonism
Cultural depictions of Joseph Smith
Television shows about religion
Frontline (American TV program)
2007 American television series debuts
2007 American television series endings